Khurvandeh (also Romanized as Khurvandeh and Khurvandeh; also known as Khurvandeh and Khurvandeh) is a village in Sardrud-e Olya Rural District, Sardrud District, Razan County, Hamadan Province, Iran. At the 2022 census, its population was 2600, in 900 families.

References 

Populated places in Razan County